Loaded Gun is the debut album from Canadian rock band Gloryhound. The album was recorded at The Farm Studios in Vancouver, British Columbia and was produced and recorded by Garth Richardson and mixed by Bob Ezrin.

Track listing

Personnel
Evan Meisner – vocals, rhythm guitar, piano
David Casey – lead guitar, vocals
Shaun Hanlon – drums, percussion
Jeremy MacPherson – bass guitar
Garth Richardson – production, 
Bob Ezrin – audio mixing at Anarchy Studios Nashville, Tennessee
Ben Kaplan  – Recording and digital editing, keyboards 
Josh Guillaume – Assistant recorder, mixing engineer
Griffin Bargholz – Assistant recorder
Flavio Cirillo – Drum tech
Jarod Snowdon – Mixing engineer
Justin Cortelyou – Mixing engineer
Brock McFarlane – Mastering at CPS Mastering
Alex MacAskill – Artwork and layout
Dirty Harry – Photography
Leigh Righton – Photography
Nathan Quinn – A&R

Singles

References

2014 debut albums
Albums produced by Garth Richardson
MNRK Music Group albums